Richard Smith (March 22, 1735 – September 17, 1803) was a lawyer and politician who served in the Continental Congress and signed the Continental Association.

Richard Smith was born in Burlington, Province of New Jersey, to Richard Smith, a member of the West Jersey Assembly, and Abigail Raper Smith. Smith was educated under private teachers and in Quaker schools and studied law. He was admitted to the bar in 1762 and practiced in Philadelphia, Pennsylvania, and later in Burlington. He was commissioned county clerk of Burlington on December 7, 1762.

Smith was chosen as a New Jersey delegate to the Continental Congress from July 23, 1774, to June 12, 1776, when he resigned. He was a member of the New Jersey Legislative Council (now the New Jersey Senate) in 1776 and was elected treasurer of New Jersey, serving 1776 until he resigned on February 15, 1777. Smith moved to Laurens, New York, in 1790, and then to Philadelphia in 1799. He died near Natchez, Mississippi, and was interred in Natchez Cemetery.

Notes

References

 Gummere, Amelia Mott (1922). The journal and essays of John Woolman. New York: The Macmillan Company.

Continental Congressmen from New Jersey
18th-century American politicians
New Jersey lawyers
Members of the New Jersey Legislative Council
Pennsylvania lawyers
People from Burlington, New Jersey
1735 births
1803 deaths
State treasurers of New Jersey
Signers of the Continental Association